Brenguļi Parish is an administrative territorial entity of Valmiera Municipality, Latvia. From 2009 until 2021, it was part of Beverīna Municipality. Prior to the 2009 administrative reforms it was part of Valmiera District.

Towns, villages and settlements of Brenguļi parish

References

Parishes of Latvia
Valmiera Municipality
Vidzeme